Brown's Requiem may refer to:
 Brown's Requiem (novel), a 1981 crime novel, the first novel by American author James Ellroy
 Brown's Requiem (film), a 1998 film written and directed by Jason Freeland